Doctor Foster: A Woman Scorned is a British psychological thriller television series that first debuted on BBC One on 9 September 2015. Created and written by Mike Bartlett, the series is about Gemma Foster (Suranne Jones), a doctor who suspects her husband Simon (Bertie Carvel) is having an affair. After she follows several lines of enquiry, she slowly begins to lose her sanity as her life unravels from what secrets she finds. The storyline was inspired by the ancient Greek myth of Medea, a wronged wife who kills her children and poisons her husband's new bride. 
Internationally, the series was brought to many countries by different networks (see Broadcast).

The second series of the show started on 5 September 2017 and concluded on 3 October 2017. A future third series has been played down by lead actress Jones, citing incompatibility of schedules. Bartlett has said while there is more to explore with Gemma Foster's story, he would bring the show back only if there were a vital story to be told, with no immediate plans for a return. He did, however, write a spin-off, Life, featuring the character of Anna Baker from the first two series.

Cast
Series one
Suranne Jones as Dr. Gemma Foster, a 37-year-old general practitioner in the town of "Parminster", who begins to suspect her husband, Simon, is having an affair
Bertie Carvel as Simon Foster, a 40-year-old property developer, Gemma's husband and the series' main antagonist.
Clare-Hope Ashitey as Carly Williams, a patient of Gemma's, who helps support Gemma, due to her suspicions of Simon
Cheryl Campbell as Helen Foster (episodes 1-3)
Jodie Comer as Kate Parks, a 23-year-old university student who has been secretly having a two-year affair with Simon Foster
Navin Chowdhry as Anwar (episodes 2–3, 5)
Victoria Hamilton as Anna Baker (episodes 1–3, 5)
Tom Taylor as Tom Foster, Gemma and Simon's 13-year-old son
Martha Howe-Douglas as Becky Hughes
Adam James as Neil Baker (episodes 1–3, 5)
Thusitha Jayasundera as Ros Mahendra
Sara Stewart as Susie Parks (episodes 1–2, 4-5)
Neil Stuke as Chris Parks (episodes 1–2, 4-5)
Robert Pugh as Jack Reynolds (episodes 1–2, 4)
Ricky Nixon as Daniel Spencer (episodes 1,4)
Daniel Cerqueira as Gordon Ward, a hypochondriac who regularly visits Gemma at the medical practice
Megan Roberts as Isobel, a friend of Tom's

Series two
Suranne Jones as Gemma Foster
Bertie Carvel as Simon Foster
Tom Taylor as Tom Foster
Jodie Comer as Kate Parks (episodes 1-4)
Victoria Hamilton as Anna Baker (episodes 1-4)
Adam James as Neil Baker (episodes 1-3)
Prasanna Puwanarajah as James, Gemma's new love interest (episodes 1–3, 5)
Sian Brooke as Siân Lambert, a new Doctor at Gemma's surgery with mysterious links to Simon (episodes 1–2, 4-5)
Hope Lloyd as Isobel (episodes 1, 3)
Frank Kauer as Max, Tom's best friend (episodes 1-3)
Thusitha Jayasundera as Ros Mahendra (episodes 1–3, 5)
Joanie Kent as Amelie Foster, Simon and Kate's daughter (episodes 1-4)
Daniel Cerqueira as Gordon Ward (episodes 1-2)
Helena Lymbery as Mrs Walters, Tom's headteacher (episodes 2-3)
Martha Howe-Douglas as Becky Hughes (episode 1)
Sara Stewart as Susie Parks (episodes 1, 4)
Neil Stuke as Chris Parks (episodes 1, 4)
Clare-Hope Ashitey as Carly Williams (episode 4)
Philip Wright as Connor, Ros' fiancé and then husband (episodes 1, 3, 5)

Episodes

Series 1 (2015)

Series 2 (2017)

 The ratings over a 28-day period, including the broadcasts on BBC One and streaming through BBC iPlayer.

Production

The series was commissioned by Charlotte Moore and Ben Stephenson. The executive producers are Roanna Benn, Greg Brenman, Jude Liknaitzky, and Matthew Read. Filming took place in Green Lane, Croxley Green, Hertfordshire, Copse Wood Way, Northwood, London, Enfield and the Market Square in Hitchin in Hertfordshire. The surgery location shoot was at the Chess Medical Centre, in Chesham in Bucks, renamed Parminster Medical Centre for the show. The railway station featured in the show was Enfield Chase station.
The scene that features Tom playing football was filmed at the Southgate Hockey Centre, Enfield.

It was announced at the end of Series 1 that the show would return for a second series, with both Suranne Jones and Bertie Carvel. At the 21st National Television Awards Jones announced that the new series began filming in September 2016.

The second series started on 5 September 2017 and concluded on 3 October 2017. The BBC is yet to confirm whether the show will return for a third series although writer Mike Bartlett does not dismiss the possibility.

Reception
In general, the show has received acclaim. The opening episode received generally positive reviews from critics, with Lucy Mangan from The Guardian calling it a "gripping portrait of a marriage slowly being poisoned," although Mangan expressed fears of the show descending into "melodrama in the not too distant future". In a review for The Daily Telegraph, Michael Hogan gave the drama four stars out of five, describing it as "an edgy nail-biter" that was "sparkily written by Olivier Award-winner Mike Bartlett", despite a soundtrack that was "overbearing".

Less enthusiastically, Victoria Segal of The Sunday Times wrote of the fourth episode that it "clattered unsteadily to its denouement ...this episode is as desperately uneven as the rest of the series, thrashing about between high melodrama and muted misery." Catherine Blythe of The Telegraph bemoaned its "absurd plot" and the lack of "emotional logic" in a series of "melodramatic contortions that required a character who was supposed to be brainy to act like an utter fool".

Accolades

Broadcast
Internationally, the series premiered in Australia on 17 November 2015 on BBC First, in New Zealand on 17 January 2016 on TV One, in France on 15 June 2016 on C8, in Poland on 3 August 2016 on Ale Kino+, in Sweden on 15 August 2016 on SVT1, and in Finland on 28. February 2018 on Yle TV1. The series aired in the US on Lifetime in April 2016 as Doctor Foster: A Woman Scorned and began streaming on Netflix in October 2016. In Spain, the series' first instalment was first broadcast on Nova in June 2018, and will air again on Antena 3 with two episodes per week as of 5 September and 6 September, respectively.

In South Korea, Doctor Foster aired on KBS 1TV from 25 January 2016 to 9 January 2018. Due to the COVID-19 pandemic, as well as the immense popularity of its local adaptation which aired on JTBC, the latter will re-air Doctor Foster following the end of the local adaptation. Graceful Friends, the drama that was supposed to air after the local adaptation, was pushed back to July 2020.

Adaptations

Spin-off
In 2020, BBC One broadcast the spin-off series Life, similarly written by Mike Bartlett and with Victoria Hamilton reprising her role as the character of Anna Baker, now known as "Belle Stone", living in a converted house in Manchester, England. The series also featured Anna's ex-husband Neil Baker (played again by Adam James).

References

External links
 
 
 
 

2010s British drama television series
2010s British medical television series
2015 British television series debuts
2017 British television series endings
Adultery in television
BBC high definition shows
BBC television dramas

English-language television shows
Television shows set in England
Works about physicians